Orthocomotis mediana is a species of moth of the family Tortricidae. It is found in Ecuador (Tungurahua Province, Pichincha Province, Napo Province, Morona-Santiago Province) and Peru.

The wingspan is 21–24.5 mm. The ground colour of the forewings is cream white, white in the terminal area and grey in the dorsal and basal portions. There are brown dots with a few rust scales on the interfasciae and green scales on the markings, which are dark brown. The hindwings are greyish brown.

Etymology
The species name refers to the median position of the process of the sacculus and is derived from Latin mediana (meaning median).

References

Moths described in 2007
Orthocomotis